Allison Renee Murphy (born 13 May 1994) is an Irish American professional footballer who plays as a midfielder for London City Lionesses of the FA Women's Championship and the Republic of Ireland women's national team.

Club career
Murphy was a second-round pick (20th overall) for Washington Spirit in the 2016 NWSL College Draft. She spent the 2016 season on the Spirit reserve team.

In search of regular first-team football, Murphy moved to Swedish Division 1 Norra Svealand club Gustafs GoIF in 2017, then signed for Houston Dash for their 2018 season. Murphy attended the Dash's open tryouts and earned an invitation to the preseason training camp before making the regular-season roster.

In June 2018, Dash waived Murphy along with Claire Falknor to make room on the roster for Sofia Huerta and Taylor Comeau, who were acquired in a trade with Chicago Red Stars. Dash coach Vera Pauw, who said Murphy needed to work the technical side of her game, arranged for her to join PEC Zwolle in the Netherlands. Murphy played in 18 matches with PEC Zwolle, 15 as a starter, during the 2018–19 season. In August 2019, she joined Selfoss in Iceland.

In July 2020, Murphy joined London City Lionesses of the English FA Women's Championship.

International career
In January 2016 Murphy trained with the touring Republic of Ireland national team, who were in California to play two matches against the United States. Her college coach Tom Stone had alerted the Football Association of Ireland that Murphy was eligible as she had grandparents from Limerick and held an Irish passport.

Senior Republic of Ireland national team coach Vera Pauw called up Murphy for the first time on 28 August 2020, for the UEFA Women's Euro 2022 qualifier against Germany on 19 September 2020. Pauw was Murphy's coach at Houston Dash, although Pauw said she was unaware of Murphy's Irish passport until she was alerted by Lionesses coach Lisa Fallon. Murphy made her international debut on 11 April 2021, starting Ireland's 1–0 friendly defeat by Belgium at King Baudouin Stadium in Brussels.

References

External links

 
 Alli Murphy at London City Lionesses
 Alli Murphy at Texas Tech Red Raiders

1994 births
Living people
Republic of Ireland women's association footballers
Women's association football midfielders
Republic of Ireland women's international footballers
Women's Championship (England) players
London City Lionesses players
Expatriate women's footballers in Iceland
Expatriate women's footballers in England
Expatriate women's footballers in the Netherlands
Soccer players from Texas
American people of Irish descent
Selfoss women's football players
Úrvalsdeild kvenna (football) players
Eredivisie (women) players
Houston Dash players
Washington Spirit draft picks
National Women's Soccer League players
Sportspeople from Plano, Texas
Expatriate women's footballers in Sweden
Texas Tech University alumni
Texas Tech Red Raiders women's soccer players
Washington Spirit players
21st-century American women